The 2021 UCI Road World Championships was the 94th edition of the UCI Road World Championships, the annual world championships for road bicycle racing. It was held between 19 and 26 September 2021 in the Flanders region of Belgium. The region was chosen in light of the centenary of the world championships with the UCI opting for a return to one of the original founding countries.

Schedule

All times listed below are for the local time – Central European Summer Time or UTC+02:00.

Medal summary

Elite events

Under-23 events

Junior events

Medal table

References

External links

 
UCI Road World Championships by year
International cycle races hosted by Belgium
World Championships
UCI Road World Championships
UCI Road World Championships